Mistero e poesia is a solo piano album by Italian pianist and composer Fabio Mengozzi, released in 2018 by Stradivarius.

Track listing
 Mysterium – 10:59
 Rivo di cenere – 2:32
 Scintilla – 2:35
 Nauta – 3:11
 Ianus – 3:08
 Commiato – 8:40
 Reverie IV – 3:49
 Artifex – 2:36
 Faro notturno – 2:38
 Viride – 5:01
 Era – 2:40
 Sempiterna ruota – 1:56
 Cometa nella notte – 3:47
 Sfinge – 7:19
 Estro – 3:26
 Ceruleo vagare – 4:34
 Ananke – 2:06
 Anelito al silenzio – 2:15

References

Contemporary classical music albums
2018 albums